In mathematics, particularly in order theory, an upper bound or majorant of a subset  of some preordered set  is an element of  that is greater than or equal to every element of . 
A set with an upper (respectively, lower) bound is said to be bounded from above or majorized (respectively bounded from below or minorized) by that bound. 
The terms bounded above (bounded below) are also used in the mathematical literature for sets that have upper (respectively lower) bounds.

Examples 

The set  has  as both an upper bound and a lower bound; all other numbers are either an upper bound or a lower bound for that .

Every subset of the natural numbers has a lower bound since the natural numbers have a least element (0 or 1, depending on convention). An infinite subset of the natural numbers cannot be bounded from above. An infinite subset of the integers may be bounded from below or bounded from above, but not both. An infinite subset of the rational numbers may or may not be bounded from below, and may or may not be bounded from above.

Every finite subset of a non-empty totally ordered set has both upper and lower bounds.

Bounds of functions

The definitions can be generalized to functions and even to sets of functions.

It indicates that the constraint is optimal, and thus cannot be further reduced without invalidating the inequality.

The function  is further said to be an upper bound of a set of functions, if it is an upper bound of each function in that set.

The notion of lower bound for (sets of) functions is defined analogously, by replacing ≥ with  ≤.

Tight bounds

An upper bound is said to be a tight upper bound, a least upper bound, or a supremum, if no smaller value is an upper bound. Similarly, a lower bound is said to be a tight lower bound, a greatest lower bound, or an infimum, if no greater value is a lower bound.

Exact upper bounds
Exact upper bounds of reduced products of linear orders play an important role in PCF theory.

See also 

 Greatest element and least element
 Infimum and supremum
 Maximal and minimal elements

References 

Mathematical terminology
Order theory
Real analysis

de:Schranke (Mathematik)
pl:Kresy dolny i górny